C. V. Chandrasekhar (born 22 May 1935) is an Indian Bharatanatyam dancer, academician, dance scholar, composer, and choreographer. He retired as Head of the Faculty of Performing Arts of M.S. University, Baroda in  1992. Professor Chandrashekhar and wife Jaya Chandrasekhar are one of the best known dancing couples of Bharata Natyam in India, during the 1970s and ’80s, they performed with their daughters Chitra and Manjari. Also, his grandchildren Viraj, Dhenuka, Harshavardhan and Amshuman have been of great support to him. He now runs his own dance institution, Nrityashree, in Chennai.

He was awarded the Sangeet Natak Akademi Award for Bharatnatyam in 1993, by the Sangeet Natak Akademi, India's National Academy of Music, Dance and Drama, and received the Kalidas Samman in 2008. In 2011, he was honoured with the Padma Bhushan by the Government of India.

Early life and training
He did his M. Sc., and thereafter received a Post graduate diploma (Bharatanatyam), after he trained at the internationally renowned Kalakshetra in Chennai, under the mentorship of Rukmini Devi Arundale, Karaikkal Saradambal, K.N. Dandaydhapani Pillai and others. He has received training classical music under teachers like Budulur Krishnamurthy Sastrigal and M.D. Ramanathan.

Career
Chandrasekhar started his dancing career in 1947, when there were few male dancers. He served at the Banaras Hindu University and later joined M.S. University of Baroda, where he retired as the Head and Dean of the Faculty of Performing Arts in 1992. C.V. Chandrasekhar is a multi-faceted personality being a dancer, choreographer, researcher, musician, academician, composer and highly acclaimed teacher of Bharatanatyam.

He has been performing for the past six decades in India and all over the globe and is invited by many dancers the world over to teach and to choreograph. He continues to perform on stage well into his seventh decade.

References

External links
 Nrityashree, website 

Living people
Bharatanatyam exponents
Academic staff of Maharaja Sayajirao University of Baroda
Indian classical choreographers
Teachers of Indian classical dance
Indian dance teachers
1935 births
Academic staff of Banaras Hindu University
Performers of Indian classical dance
Indian male composers
Recipients of the Sangeet Natak Akademi Award
Recipients of the Padma Bhushan in arts
Kalakshetra Foundation alumni
Indian choreographers
20th-century Indian dancers
Recipients of the Sangeet Natak Akademi Fellowship